Valmont may refer to:

Places
Valmont, Moselle, a commune in the Moselle department, France
Valmont, Seine-Maritime, a commune in the Seine-Maritime department, France
Valmont, Colorado, an area northeast of central Boulder, Colorado, USA
Valmont (river), a river in France that runs from Valmont, Seine-Maritime to the English channel

Characters
Valmont (Jackie Chan Adventures), a character in the animated series Jackie Chan Adventures
Vicomte Sébastien de Valmont, a character in the 1782 French novel Les Liaisons dangereuses and its adaptations, created by Choderlos de Laclos

Film
Valmont (film), a 1989 French-American drama film based on the novel Les Liaisons dangereuses, starring Colin Firth as Valmont

Companies and products
Valmont Industries, a large Nebraska-based manufacturer of center pivot irrigation systems and steel utility poles
 Valmont, a trade mark owned by Lactalis, a French dairy products corporation
 Valmont Group, a Swiss cellular cosmetics company

See also
Battle of Valmont, a  1416 battle in the area of Valmont, Seine-Maritime during the Hundred Years' War
Valmont (sanatorium) , Montreux, Switzerland